William Charles Merrick (born 9 April 1993) is an English screen and stage actor. His debut was in the third generation of the BAFTA winning, E4 television series Skins as the character Alo Creevey.

Early life and education
Merrick originates from Ledbury in Herefordshire. In 2009 he was one of the top ten of over 50,000 candidates nationally in his drama GCSE examination.

Career
As a member of the Close up Theatre Merrick performed at the Edinburgh Festival Fringe 2010 and 2011, in the productions of The History Boys playing Posner and Arthur Miller's masterpiece Death of a Salesman in the role of Charley. At the Edinburgh Festival Fringe 2012–2013 Merrick started a theatre company called No Prophet at 18 and played roles in Punk Rock, a stage production by Simon Stephens, and in Boys written by Ella Hickson.

In 2011, Merrick made his first television appearance in the E4 teen drama Skins, playing Alo Creevey. Originally he auditioned in Bristol for the role of Rich Hardbeck and became Alo at the end of the audition process. He described his character as a " loving person, very open-minded, positive and enthusiastic kind of guy."

In February 2012 Merrick won the RTS Award for Best Actor, competing with Dakota Blue Richards, his co-star in Skins. For his role as Alo Creevey he got also a nomination for Best Actor at TV Choice Awards 2012.

In May 2012 Merrick recorded an episode of BBC One family sitcom In with the Flynns, in which he plays the role of Dean. In the same year he has landed his first big screen role as Jay in Richard Curtis' new romantic comedy About Time alongside Hollywood star Rachel McAdams and Domhnall Gleeson.

Merrick appeared in a 2013 episode of the popular sci-fi television programme Doctor Who, in the episode Nightmare in Silver, where he played a character named Brains. He also starred as Tom alongside Jessie Cave in an episode of Coming Up aired on Channel 4 in July 2013 and was a guest star in fantasy BBC series Atlantis. Merrick also starred as the legendary Steve Davis in the 2016 BBC drama The Rack Pack. In 2016 Merrick played Butcher's apprentice Russell in the ITV drama series Brief Encounters. He played Arthur Solway in two episodes of BBC's Poldark. From 2019 to 2021 Merrick starred as fanatic gamer Nicky in the sitcom series Dead Pixels.

Personal life
Will is the younger of 2 children. Merrick has said "I play the guitar but I'm a bit of a dosser really".

Filmography and television

Theatre

References

External links

1993 births
Living people
People educated at Dean Close School
English male stage actors
English male television actors
English male film actors
People from Ledbury
21st-century English male actors
English male child actors
People educated at The Downs School, Herefordshire
Male actors from Hertfordshire